FaceGen is a 3D face-generating 3D modeling middleware produced by Singular Inversions.

Approach
Although FaceGen generates conventional 3D mesh data, it uses a "parameterized" approach to defining the properties that make up a face, and by using a fixed set of parameters it is able to morph and modify a face model independently of output resolution. FaceGen 3.3 allows the user to randomize, tween, normalize and exaggerate faces, and also includes algorithms for adjusting apparent age, ethnicity and gender. It also allows limited parametric control of facial expressions, and includes a set of phoneme expressions for the animation of characters with "speaking" roles. 

FaceGen can also generate 3D models from front and side images of a face, or by analyzing a single photograph.

Free versions
Free demo versions of FaceGen Artist, FaceGen 3D Print and FaceGen Modeller can be downloaded from the company's website. These allow the user to create, edit, load and save files in the program's proprietary ".fg" format. The free version features the same functionality of the paid version, except that a logo is placed on the forehead of models that are generated and only a few additional assets like hairstyles and beards are provided.

External links
 FaceGen official homepage
 Discovery Channel interview

Anatomical simulation
Windows graphics-related software
3D imaging